The Academy of Motion Picture Arts and Sciences has given Academy Awards to actors and actresses for non-English performances in films, with the first award given in 1961. For an actor or actress to be eligible for any of the Academy Awards for Best Actor, Best Actress, Best Supporting Actor, or Best Supporting Actress for a foreign language performance in a film produced outside the United States, the film must have been commercially released in Los Angeles County and have English subtitles with the theatrical release. 

This list is current as of the 95th Academy Awards ceremony held on March 12, 2023.

In 1962, Sophia Loren became the first actor to win an Oscar for a foreign-language performance.

, 52 actors and actresses have been nominated for Academy Awards for non-English language performances. Nineteen of these actors and actresses have received Academy Awards for their performances:
Six actors have won for performances that were mostly or solely spoken in a language other than English: Sophia Loren for Two Women (Italian), Robert De Niro for The Godfather Part II (Italian), Roberto Benigni for Life Is Beautiful (Italian), Benicio del Toro for Traffic (Spanish), Marion Cotillard for La Vie en Rose (French), and Youn Yuh-jung for Minari (Korean).
Four actors have won for performances mostly spoken in English: Penélope Cruz for her English and Spanish-language performance in Vicky Cristina Barcelona, Christoph Waltz for Inglourious Basterds (English, German, French and Italian), Ke Huy Quan and Michelle Yeoh for Everything Everywhere All at Once (English, Mandarin and Cantonese).
Six actors have won for performances that were mostly or solely in sign language: Jane Wyman for Johnny Belinda (American Sign Language), Patty Duke for The Miracle Worker (American Sign Language), John Mills for Ryan's Daughter (British Sign Language), Marlee Matlin for Children of a Lesser God (American Sign Language), Holly Hunter for The Piano (British Sign Language), and Troy Kotsur for CODA (American Sign Language).

Seven actors have had multiple Academy Award nominations for foreign-language performances: Marcello Mastroianni (three Best Actor nominations for Italian-language performances), Sophia Loren (one Academy Award for Best Actress for Two Women and another Best Actress nomination for Marriage Italian-Style, both for Italian-language performances), Liv Ullmann (two Best Actress nominations for Swedish-language performances), Isabelle Adjani (two Best Actress nominations for French-language performances), Javier Bardem (two Best Actor nominations for Spanish-language performances), Marion Cotillard (one Academy Award for Best Actress for La Vie en Rose and another Best Actress nomination for Two Days, One Night, both for French-language performances), and Penelope Cruz (two Best Actress nominations for Spanish-language performances).

Sophia Loren and Marion Cotillard are the only actresses to win an Academy Award for Best Actress for non-English language performances, Italian and French, respectively. Cotillard is the only actor to receive two Oscar nominations for foreign films without having her films nominated for an Academy Award for Best Foreign Language Film. She is also the only actor to be nominated for a Belgian film (Two Days, One Night).

Roberto Benigni is the only actor to win an Academy Award for Best Actor for a non-English language performance.

Twelve actors have been nominated for Sign Language performances: Jane Wyman for Johnny Belinda (American Sign Language); Patty Duke for The Miracle Worker (American Sign Language); Alan Arkin for The Heart Is a Lonely Hunter (American Sign Language); John Mills for Ryan's Daughter (British Sign Language); Marlee Matlin for Children of a Lesser God (American Sign Language); Holly Hunter for The Piano (British Sign Language); Samantha Morton for Sweet and Lowdown (American Sign Language); Rinko Kikuchi for Babel (Japanese Sign Language), Sally Hawkins for The Shape of Water (American Sign Language); Riz Ahmed and Paul Raci for Sound of Metal (American Sign Language); Troy Kotsur for CODA.

Nominees

Notes
 The film was produced in the United States and/or contains primarily English dialogue.

Most nominated languages
BA = Best Actor/Actress nominations.
BSA = Best Supporting Actor/Actress nominations.

See also 

List of actors with two or more Academy Award nominations in acting categories
List of Academy Award-winning foreign language films
List of Academy Award records
List of Academy Award winners and nominees for Best Foreign Language Film

References
General

Specific

External links
The Official Academy Awards Database
The Motion Picture Credits Database
IMDb Academy Awards Page

Academy Awards lists
Lists of film actors